Meet the Navy is a 1946 British musical comedy film based on the Canadian musical revue Meet the Navy. Filmed in England in November 1945, it was directed by Alfred Travers and produced by British National Films. It starred Lionel Murton, Margaret Hurst and Robert John Pratt. A musical troupe entertain sailors from the Royal Canadian Navy during the Second World War, and the film shows their personal history and experiences. The film concludes with a Technicolor sequence, with the cast involved in a Royal Command Performance, featuring a young Princess Elizabeth.

Cast
 Lionel Murton ...  Johnny 
 Margaret Hurst ...  Midge 
 Robert John Pratt ...  Horace 
 Robert Goodier ...  Tommy 
 Phyllis Hudson ...  Jenny 
 Percy Haynes ...  Cook 
 Bill Oliver ...  C.P.O. Oliver 
 Jeanette De Hueck ...  Gracie 
 Oscar Natzke ...  Fisherman 
 Alan Lund ...  Dancer 
 Billy Mae Richards ...  Dancer

Box Office
According to Kinematograph Weekly the 'biggest winner' at the box office in 1946 Britain was The Wicked Lady, with "runners up" being The Bells of St Marys, Piccadilly Incident, The Road to Utopia, Tomorrow is Forever, Brief Encounter, Wonder Man, Anchors Away, Kitty, The Captive Heart, The Corn is Green, Spanish Main, Leave Her to Heaven, Gilda, Caravan, Mildred Pierce, Blue Dahlia, Years Between, O.S.S., Spellbound, Courage of Lassie, My Reputation, London Town, Caesar and Cleopatra, Meet the Navy, Men of Two Worlds, Theirs is the Glory, The Overlanders, and Bedelia.

Critical reception
Allmovie described the film as "Virtually plotless, the British Meet the Navy is not so much a film as a musical revue. Which is as it should be, since the film is based on the Royal Canadian Navy stage show of the same name, originally put together by radio musical arranger Louis Silvers and choreographer Larry Ceballos. Like its Hollywood predecessor This Is the Army, Meet the Navy is so smooth and professional-looking that one doubts the publicity claims that the cast was composed entirely of talented amateurs. Few of the cast members went on to illustrious careers, though most were certainly capable of doing so"; and TV Guide gave the film two out of four stars, calling it "An entertaining British musical."

References

External links

 dance history of the film

1946 films
British musical comedy films
Films directed by Alfred Travers
British black-and-white films
1946 musical comedy films
Films shot at British National Studios
1940s English-language films
1940s British films